Dalek Empire is an audio play series made by Big Finish Productions about the Daleks. This series ties in elements from the Dalek Empire arc in the Doctor Who: The Monthly Range, a storyline containing the releases The Genocide Machine, The Apocalypse Element, The Mutant Phase and The Time of the Daleks.

Nicholas Briggs wrote, directed and voices the Daleks in all episodes of this series. He is also the voice of the Daleks in the 2005 revival of Doctor Who.

Episodes

Series 1 (2001)

Series 2 (2003)

Series 3 (2004)

Series 4 (2007–08)

References

Dalek Empire audio plays
Audio plays by Nicholas Briggs
Audio plays based on Doctor Who
Big Finish Productions
Doctor Who spin-offs